Stoian Stelian (born 1 February 1965) is a Romanian diplomat and is currently the Permanent Representative of Romania to NATO. Previously he has been the Permanent Representative of Romania to the Council of Europe

Honours and awards
 The National Order "Pentru Merit", in rank of knight - 2003 
 "Meritul Diplomatic", in rank of officer – 2007
 "Diplomat of the year - 2012"  and citations for the outstanding work and achievements as DCM in 2002 and 2003
 Certificate of appreciation, awarded by the Assistant Secretary of State for European and Eurasian Affairs, US Department of State – March 2004.

References

Romanian diplomats
1965 births
Living people